Netfrastructure is both a web application development and database tool for Java and the name of the company which produces it. It was founded by Jim Starkey, a database architect. In 2006, MySQL AB acquired Netfrastructure.

Netfrastructure database was the basis for the Falcon storage engine of the MySQL database.

References

External links
Netfrastructure web site [dead]
Netfrastructure web site [archive]

Programming tools
Information technology companies of the United States